John Stephen Oldfield (born 19 August 1943) is a former professional footballer, who played for Huddersfield Town, Wolverhampton Wanderers, Crewe Alexandra and Bradford City.

John Oldfield was a keeper who set a record by saving penalties in successive games against Arsenal and Liverpool more than 40 years ago.

References

1943 births
2002 deaths
English footballers
Association football goalkeepers
English Football League players
Huddersfield Town A.F.C. players
Wolverhampton Wanderers F.C. players
Crewe Alexandra F.C. players
Bradford City A.F.C. players
Place of birth missing